Arusianus Messius, or Messus, Latin grammarian, flourished in the 4th century.

Life
He was the author of a small extant work Exempla Elocutionum, dedicated to Olybrius and Probinus, consuls for the year 395. It contains an alphabetical list, chiefly of verbs admitting more than one construction, with examples from each of the four writers, Virgil, Sallust, Terence and Cicero.

Cassiodorus, the only writer who mentions Arusianus, refers to his work Exempla Elocutionum by the term Quadriga.

References

Attribution:

Sources 
Heinrich Keil, Grammatici Latini, vii.
WHD Suringar, Historia Critica Scholiastarum Latinorum (1834–1835)
Van der Hoeven, Specimen Literarium (1845)

External links
Corpus Grammaticorum Latinorum: complete texts and full bibliography

Grammarians of Latin
4th-century Romans
4th-century Latin writers
Messii